Kuybyshevsky District is an administrative and municipal district (raion), one of the thirty in Novosibirsk Oblast, Russia. It is located in the center of the oblast. Its administrative center is the town of Kuybyshev (which is not administratively a part of the district). Population: 15,466 (2010 Census);

Administrative and municipal status
Within the framework of administrative divisions, Kuybyshevsky District is one of the thirty in the oblast. The town of Kuybyshev serves as its administrative center, despite being incorporated separately as an administrative unit with the status equal to that of the districts.

As a municipal division, the district is incorporated as Kuybyshevsky Municipal District, with the Town of Kuybyshev being incorporated within it as Kuybyshev Urban Settlement.

References

Notes

Sources

Districts of Novosibirsk Oblast
